St. John's Methodist Episcopal Church and Joshua Thomas Chapel is a historic Methodist Episcopal church complex located at Deal Island, Somerset County, Maryland. The complex consists of St. John's Methodist Episcopal Church, an 1879 frame Gothic building; Joshua Thomas Chapel, an 1850 Greek Revival frame structure; and the surrounding cemetery with 19th and 20th century burials and markers.  The church features a three-story bell tower.  The chapel is the oldest site in Somerset County in continuous use for Methodist meetings, which began in tents in 1828.

It was listed on the National Register of Historic Places in 1990.

References

External links
, including undated photo, at Maryland Historical Trust

Methodist churches in Maryland
Churches on the National Register of Historic Places in Maryland
Churches in Somerset County, Maryland
Churches completed in 1850
19th-century Methodist church buildings in the United States
Carpenter Gothic church buildings in Maryland
Greek Revival church buildings in Maryland
National Register of Historic Places in Somerset County, Maryland
Methodist Episcopal churches in the United States